Rhododendron hemsleyanum (波叶杜鹃) is a rhododendron species native to Mount Emei in Sichuan, China, where it grows at altitudes of 1200–1500 meters. It is a shrub or small tree that grows to 2–9 meters in height, with leathery leaves that are oblong to oblong-ovate, and 9–21 × 4.6–10.5 cm in size. Flowers are fragrant and white.

References 
 E. H. Wilson, Bull. Misc. Inform. Kew. 1910: 109. 1910.
 The Plant List
 Flora of China
 Hirsutum.com

hemsleyanum